This article is a list of diseases of verbena (Verbena × hybrida).

Fungal diseases

Viral diseases

References
Common Names of Diseases, The American Phytopathological Society

Verbena